K. S. Prasad was an Indian cinematographer, editor, production designer, producer, and director known for his works in Telugu, Tamil, Kannada, and Hindi language films. He received the National Film Award for Best Cinematography (color) for the 1968 Tamil film Thillana Mohanambal at the 16th National Film Awards.

Early life
K. S. Prasad was born in 1923 into a Telugu speaking family in Eluru, Andhra Pradesh. He earned degree in Photography from St. Xavier's Technical Institute, Mumbai. He made his foray into cinema with the 1956 Black and White Telugu film Ilavelpu, and the 1964 Tamil color film Puthiya Paravai.

Selected filmography
As cinematographer
Justice Raja (1983)
Devajani (1981)
Seeta Labkush (1980)
Mathura Bijaya (1979)
Sri Raam Vanavas (1977)
Sita Swayamvar (1976)
Seeta Kalyanam (1976)
Satyam (1976)
Ramaiah Thandri (1975)
Sri Ramanjaneya Yuddham (1975)
Kode Nagu (1974)
Sampoorna Ramayan (1973)
Sampoorna Ramayanam (1971)
Haathi Mere Saathi (1971)
Bhale Mastaru (1969)
Thillana Mohanambal (1968)
Gauri (1968)
Thiruvarutchelvar (1967)
Kandan Karunai (1967)
Saraswathi Sabatham (1966)
Thiruvilaiyadal (1965)
Pudhiya Paravai (1964)
Ilavelpu (1956)

As producer
Vamsha Jyothi (1978)
Baalu Belagithu (1970) (also production designer)

As direcor
Rajyamlo Rabandulu (1975)

As editor
Sri Raam Vanavas (1977)

References

External links

Tamil film cinematographers
1923 births
Telugu people
Date of death missing
Malayalam film cinematographers
Tamil Nadu State Film Awards winners
Best Cinematography National Film Award winners
20th-century Indian film directors
Screenwriters from Andhra Pradesh
Telugu film cinematographers
St. Xavier's College, Mumbai alumni
20th-century Indian dramatists and playwrights
Hindi-language film directors
Tamil film directors
Telugu screenwriters
Hindi screenwriters
20th-century Indian photographers
Cinematographers from Andhra Pradesh